Natela Dzalamidze and Valeriya Strakhova were the defending champions, but both players chose not to participate.

Katharina Gerlach and Julia Wachaczyk won the title, defeating Misa Eguchi and Akiko Omae in the final, 4–6, 6–1, [10–7].

Seeds

Draw

References
Main Draw

Reinert Open - Doubles
Reinert Open